Michael D. "Mike" Unes (born July 2, 1974) is a Republican member of the Illinois House of Representatives; he has represented the 91st District since 2011.

Unes was born in Peoria, Illinois on July 2, 1974.  He attended Bradley University, graduating with a B.A. in Communications.

He was on the East Peoria city council, resigning in November 2010 after being elected to the Illinois House.  He won his seat in the Illinois House of Representatives by defeating eight-term incumbent Michael K. Smith of Canton, Illinois.

Unes has a wife, named Natalie, and four children.

On October 24, 2019, Unes announced his decision to retire at the end of the 101st General Assembly. He was succeeded by fellow Republican Mark Luft. As of 2021, Unes is a Vice President of the UnityPoint Health — Methodist Proctor Foundation, which provides healthcare in the Greater Peoria area.

References

External links
Representative Michael Unes (R) 91st District at the Illinois General Assembly
By session: 98th, 97th 
State Representative Mike Unes — Campaign website
 

1974 births
Living people
Bradley University alumni
Illinois city council members
Republican Party members of the Illinois House of Representatives
Politicians from Peoria, Illinois
Place of birth missing (living people)
21st-century American politicians
People from East Peoria, Illinois